Schwenk may refer to:

Adolph G. Schwenk (1922–2004), American Marine general
Bud Schwenk (1917–1980), football player
 Fran Schwenk (born c. 1948), football player
 Hal Schwenk (1890–1955), baseball pitcher
 Theodor Schwenk (1910–1986), water researcher
 Thomas L. Schwenk (born 1949), dean of the University of Nevada School of Medicine
 Tripp Schwenk (born 1971), swimmer
 Zane Schwenk (born 1975), wakeboarder

See also
 Schwenk's theorem